Gawler Primary School is a state school in South Australia opened in January 1878.  It is located on the edge of the historic Church Hill State Heritage Area of Gawler. The Gothic-styled bluestone main building and the original headmaster's residence (added in 1881) are listed on the now-defunct Register of the National Estate.

Opened as the Gawler Public School, it was built by William Tardiff to the design of architect E. J. Wood at a cost of 4,695 pounds and could accommodate 600 pupils.  The first headmaster was E. L. Burton who had been headmaster of St. George's Church of England Day School.

It is part of the Gawler Church Hill State Heritage Area.

References

Footnotes

Sources
http://www.gawlerps.sa.edu.au/index.html
https://www.environment.sa.gov.au/our-places/heritage/visiting-heritage-places/state-heritage-areas/Gawler_Church_Hill
J.S. Clark, "One Hundred Years of Gawler Primary School"

South Australian places listed on the defunct Register of the National Estate
1878 establishments in Australia
Gawler, South Australia
Gothic Revival architecture in Australia
Primary schools in South Australia